Li Su may refer to:

Li Su (Han dynasty) (died 192), military officer under the warlords Dong Zhuo and Lü Bu
Li Su (Tang dynasty) (773–821), general of the Tang dynasty
Su Li (born 1985), Chinese sport shooter

See also
Lisu (disambiguation)